Günther's pipehorse (Solegnathus lettiensis) is a species of fish in the family Syngnathidae. It is found in Australia and Indonesia.

References

Sources

Solegnathus
Fish described in 1860
Taxonomy articles created by Polbot